Reverb Records was formed in Dublin, Ireland in 1999. Owner Michael Fitzgerald moved the label to Portland, Oregon in 2002. Reverb has released records by Basic, Chequeboard, David J, Drakes Hotel, The High Violets, Lab Partners, Nina Hynes, Tenspeedracer, The Upsidedown and released compilations including The Raveonettes, A Place to Bury Strangers, Serena Maneesh, Pete International Airport, Insect Guide, Hopewell, Ringo Deathstarr, The Vandelles, The Dazzling Strangers, Asobe Seksu, Joy Wants Eternity.

Artists

Basic
Chequeboard
David J
Drakes Hotel
High Violets
Lab Partners
Nina Hynes
Tenspeedracer
The Upsidedown
The Shoegazers Ball

Discography

2011

Songs From a Sonic Place, Various Artists

2010

Basic Singles Club, Basic

The Town With Bad Writing, The Upsidedown

Wolf Blood Honey, The Upsidedown

2008

Angels and Demons, Space and Time, Hypatia Lake

2007

Satellite Remixes, High Violets

Keep Quiet, Lab Partners

Tell Me Everything, Drakes Hotel

2006

Musicfest NW 06, Various Artists

To Where You Are, High Violets

2005

Wicked Branches, Lab Partners

Splinters of the Cross EP, Basic with David J

2004

Trust Electricity, The Upsidedown

2003

In a Different Place, Various Artists

2002

NW Shoegazerbliss, Various Artists

Gothica, Chequerboard

Staros, Nina Hynes

Mono Prix, Nina Hynes

44 Down, High Violets

2001

Reverb Compilation, Various Artists

Can I Sleep Now, Nina Hynes

January, Tenspeedracer

2000

Death to Disco, Tenspeedracer

Eskimo Beach Boy, Tenspeedracer

Ballad of Greedy Man, Tenspeedracer

1999

Creation, Nina Hynes

External links
Reverb Records

American independent record labels
Oregon record labels
Companies based in Portland, Oregon
Privately held companies based in Oregon
1999 establishments in Oregon